The U.S. Army universal camouflage trials took place from 2002 to 2004 with the goal of creating a single pattern that would provide adequate concealment in all environments. Four different patterns in a total of 13 variations were tested during the evaluation: three woodland patterns, three desert, three urban, three desert/urban, and one multi-environment pattern.  The Universal Camouflage Pattern (UCP) found on the UCP-ACU was eventually adopted despite not having been part of the test.

Development
Six patterns were originally developed in early 2002 and reviewed for effectiveness, with three of the six designs being rejected due to limited effectiveness. The final three patterns were evaluated at the U.S. Army Natick Soldier Center, and four color schemes were created for each pattern.  The woodland patterns consisted of tan, green, brown and black; the desert patterns tan, dark tan, khaki and brown; the urban patterns tan, light gray, medium gray and black, and the desert/urban patterns contained tan, dark tan, light gray and brown. A common ground shade, tan, was selected for all patterns to allow individual equipment to be interchangeable if more than one color scheme were adopted.  The patterns were All Over Brush, Shadow Line, Track, and Scorpion, co-developed with contractor Crye Precision.  The goal was to develop a single pattern that would perform well in all terrains.

Patterns

All Over Brush

All Over Brush consisted of swirls of colors similar to patches of grass and brush.  In a poll from the Army Times in 2002, All Over Brush was voted the most popular pattern in the woodland, desert, and urban schemes.  The urban and desert/urban schemes were eliminated in the first phase of testing, with woodland being eliminated during the second phase of testing.  Desert All Over Brush made it through phase three and four in a modified, more all-environment friendly form.

Shadow Line

The Shadow Line pattern sported horizontal lines with slashes.  All four color combinations were eliminated during the first phase of testing.

Track

The Track pattern featured vertical lines with small, irregular marks present throughout.  All four color combinations made it to phase two of testing, with a modified woodland pattern and modified urban pattern making it through phases three and four.

Scorpion 

Scorpion was developed in conjunction with defense contractor Crye Precision. The pattern consists of six colors with an irregular spread throughout, and was designed to be effective in multiple environments. Following the trials, Crye began producing a slightly altered version for the commercial market as MultiCam.

Pattern testing
Testing occurred in four different phases between August 2002 and March 2004 at Fort Benning, Fort Irwin, Fort Lewis, Fort Polk and the Yakima Training Center. A total of 15 evaluations took place. Trained soldiers rated the patterns based on blending, brightness, contrast and detection. Patterns were tested separately in phase two. The modified Desert All Over Brush, Woodland Track, Urban Track and Scorpion were evaluated in phases three and four. During phase four of testing, the selected patterns were printed on Future Force Warrior ensembles and evaluated from four different angles against woodland, desert and urban backgrounds.

Adoption of UCP and replacement

Discounting the results of testing, the US Army ultimately adopted UCP for its uniforms. The US Army initially asserted that this was a digitized version of its Urban Track pattern. Despite denials, UCP was in fact a three-color variation of the earlier US Marines MARPAT scheme, which had been based on the Canadian CADPAT scheme. UCP uses a color palette of light sand, sage green and grey, giving it a distinctive grey appearance. UCP had not been part of the original camouflage trials and the uniform has received considerable criticism since its adoption as failing to provide adequate concealment in most theaters of operation.

After being directed by the US Congress to reconsider, the US Army discontinued UCP and now considers the program a mistake. Four new patterns were tested to give soldiers different patterns suitable for different environments, plus a single neutral pattern to be used on more expensive body armor and other gear. Until the new pattern is fully fielded, soldiers deployed to Afghanistan were being issued MultiCam uniforms with UCP remaining in service elsewhere.

The Operational Camouflage Pattern, a modified version of the Scorpion pattern from the original trials, has been selected as the new pattern. It has been authorized for wear since 1 July 2015. UCP was authorized until 1 October 2019.

See also
List of camouflage patterns

References

External links
Trial information
2002 Natick article

United States Army uniforms

Camouflage patterns